Days of Grace is a compilation album by composer C.W. Vrtacek, released on March 12, 1992 through Dom America. It comprises two of Vrtacek's out-of-print records, Victory Through Grace and Days and Days.

Release and reception 

Allmusic critic John Bush stated that concerning Vrtacek, Days of Grace "displays his gift of incorporating many genres (including jazz, electronic, ambient) within the frame of rock."

Track listing

Personnel 
Jon Carlson – production
Nick Didkovsky – mixing
Leslie Elias – voice on "Flags"
Jim Flora – photography
Nick Jacobs – voice on "Flags"
Mel Lovrin – voice on "A Foreign Gun", keyboards on "Nearly Temporary"
Peter Nuhn – illustration
Roger Seibel – mastering
C.W. Vrtacek – guitar, synthesizer, tape, clarinet, drums, percussion, violin, mandolin, voice, keyboards, engineering, mixing

References 

1992 compilation albums
C.W. Vrtacek albums